"Key to My Life" is the third single from Irish boy band Boyzone, taken from their debut album, Said and Done (1995). After two covers, it became their first single to be an original song, co-written by members of the group. The song became the group's second  1 single in Ireland and reached No. 3 on the UK Singles Chart, receiving a silver sales certification for shipments of over 200,000 units in the UK. "Key to My Life" also reached the top 40 in Belgium, Iceland, and the Netherlands.

Critical reception
In his weekly UK chart commentary, James Masterton wrote, "Their second hit could have suffered from not being such a well known song but the pretty teen ballad is having none of it, their second instant Top 10 hit in succession and for now there is clearly no stopping them." A reviewer from Music & Media commented, "In their homeland Ireland, the boyz' own fan club is already strong enough to kick their main inspirators Take That off the top slot with another sugary ballad." British magazine Music Week gave it five out of five and named it Single of the Week, writing, "Boyzone, who reached number two with their "Love Me for a Reason" cover, could go all the way with this excellent self-penned ballad. The cheery, cheesy dance mix, which is also included, could have made it in its own right."

Music video
A music video was produced to promote the single, featuring the band performing in a classroom at a school. It was later published on Boyzone's official YouTube channel in December 2009. The video had generated more than 3,4 million views as of September 2021.

Track listings
 UK CD single
 "Key to My Life" (radio edit)
 "Key to My Life" (Unlocked Mix)
 "When Will You Understand?"

 Australasian CD single
 "Key to My Life" (radio edit)
 "Key to My Life" (Unlocked Mix)
 "When Will You Understand?"
 "Boyzone, Spoken Word"

Charts and certifications

Weekly charts

Year-end charts

Certifications

References

1990s ballads
1994 songs
1995 singles
Boyzone songs
Irish Singles Chart number-one singles
Polydor Records singles
Song recordings produced by Ray Hedges
Songs written by Michael Graham (singer)
Songs written by Ray Hedges
Songs written by Ronan Keating
Songs written by Stephen Gately